Timothy Johnson (born August 5, 1977, in Middleton, Massachusetts) is an American professional racing cyclist who has found success in cyclocross and road bicycle racing, and is one of only five male riders (Jonathan Page was 2nd at worlds in 2007 and Matt Kelly was 1st at worlds in 1999 along with Danny Summerhill and Walker Ferguson) from the United States to stand on a UCI Cyclocross World Championships podium. Johnson has six career national championships – three Elite, two Espoir and one Junior – and a bronze medal from the UCI Cyclocross World Championships that he won in 1999 in Poprad, Slovakia. Johnson spent his 2009 road season riding for the Ouch presented by Maxxis team, of which he is the Road Captain. For 2010, Johnson rode for UnitedHealthcare Pro Cycling Team presented by Maxxis. Johnson is married to fellow professional cyclist Lyne Bessette.  In June 2018 Tim was named the director for development for the USA Cycling Foundation.

Major accomplishments 
Johnson was arguably 2009's most successful American Cyclocross rider, winning 11 races, including the US Cyclocross National Championships in Bend, Oregon. In 2009, Johnson was first in the North American Cyclocross Trophy overall standings and second in the US Gran Prix of Cyclocross overall standings. Johnson missed the first five major UCI races of the season, including the first weekend of the US Gran Prix of Cyclocross, due to a separated shoulder he suffered at Star Crossed in Redmond, Washington.

Johnson finally won the coveted US Gran Prix of Cyclocross overall title in 2008, wearing the Cyclocross National Champion jersey, winning three of the series' six races. Johnson missed time late in the season due to a knee injury, but still managed to finish second in the North American Cyclocross Trophy overall standings, despite missing two of the series' eight races.

In 2007, Johnson captured his second U.S. national cyclocross championship repeating his 2000 success. Video production company DH Productions produced a documentary about Johnson's 2007–2008 season, following his success from early season success through his National Championships victory and his subsequent trip to the UCI World Championships in Treviso, Italy. The film was titled the 9 Ball Diaries, paying homage to the design of Johnson's Cannondale/Leer/Cyclocrossworld.com team jersey and Cannondale's Cyclocross bicycle.

In 2006, Johnson finished the season without landing outside the top-4 in any Cyclocross race entered. As a co-captain of the Health Net Professional Cycling Team he helped the team achieve its 3rd consecutive #1 NRC Ranking.

In 2005, Johnson edged two-time defending champion Mark McCormack to win the New England Championship Cyclo-Cross Series title and finished second overall in the United States Gran Prix of Cyclocross series after leading the Overall.

In 2003, Johnson won two stages and the overall title at the Herald Sun Tour, a road bicycle racing stage race held in Australia. Johnson won the tour's ninth stage from Horsham to Mount William. Two days later, Johnson won the tour's twelfth stage, a criterium in Echuca. The following day, Johnson finished second on the tour's thirteenth and final stage, taking a narrow 33 second victory over Australia's Luke Roberts.

Championships
Johnson has won United States Cyclocross National Championships on six occasions. Johnson won his first as a Junior rider in 1995 in Leicester, Mass Johnson won his first of his U23 Cyclocross National Championships in 1998 in Fort Devens, Massachusetts and won his second the next year in 1999 in Presido, California. In 2000, Johnson was on the top step of the podium for the third year in a row, this year as an Elite rider, winning his first Elite title in Kansas City, Kansas. It was not until 2007 that Johnson found himself back in the Stars and Stripes jersey, winning the 2007 National Championship, again in Kansas City, Kansas. Johnson again won in 2009, taking his third Elite National Title, this time in Bend, Oregon.

After winning the Espoir's National Title in 1999, Johnson went on to the UCI Cyclocross World Championships in Poprad, Slovakia, where he rode his way to a third-place finish. Johnson's bronze medal was the first time a cyclocross rider from the United States had stood on the podium at the UCI Cyclocross World Championships, coming just one day before a surprising victory by U.S. rider Matt Kelly in the junior's event. Johnson had finished 10th at the World Championships in 1998 when they were held in Middelfart, Denmark

Palmares 

1995
 (Junior)  Cyclo-cross National Champion – Leicester, Massachusetts
1998
 (U23)  Cyclo-cross National Champion – Fort Devens, Massachusetts
(U23) 10th Cyclocross World Championships Middelfart, Denmark
1999
 (U23)  Cyclo-cross National Champion – Presido, California
 (U23) 3rd Cyclocross World Championships Poprad, Slovakia
2000
  Cyclocross National Champion – Kansas City, Kansas
 1st Mount Washington Hill Climb
 1st Sterling Road Race
 1st Harvard Road Race
2001 – Saturn
 1st KOM, Tour of Willamette
 1st Mount Washington Hill Climb
 1st Cherry Blossom Classic
 1st Amherst International Cyclo-cross
 1st Chicago SuperCup Cyclocross
2002 – Saturn
 13th Cyclocross World Championships Zolder, Belgium
 13th Wetzikon World Cup Switzerland
 2nd Cyclocross National Championships Baltimore
 SuperCup
 2nd SuperCup #1 – Chicago
 2nd SuperCup #2 – Boston
 4th SuperCup #3 – Baltimore
 1st Chameleon Cross
 1st KOM, Tour of Slovenia
 2nd ECV Cyclocross Gloucester, Massachusetts
 2nd Granogue Cyclocross Wilmington, Delaware
 3rd La Classique Montreal-Quebec
 3rd Amherst Cyclocross Northampton, Massachusetts
2003 – Saturn
 1st Overall – Herald Sun Tour
 1st Stage #9 – Mount William, Australia
 1st Stage #12 – Echuca, Australia
 2nd Stage #13 – Buningyong, Australia
 3rd Stage #8 – Horsham, Australia
 7th Stage #6 – Port Fairy, Australia
 1st Points Competition, Nature Valley Grand Prix
 1st KOM, International Tour de 'Toona,
 1st La Classique Montreal-Quebec
 1st Fort Collins Grand Prix
 1st TT Stage, Multi-Laser Grand Prix
2005 – Jittery Joe's/Kalahari and Cyclocrossworld.com/Louis Garneau
 1st Overall, Verge New England Cyclo-cross Series (NECCS)
 2nd Overall, Crankbrothers USGP of Cyclocross Series
 1st USGP #3 – Gran Prix of Gloucester #1 Gloucester, Massachusetts
 3rd USGP #6 – Clark Natwick GP San Francisco
 3rd USGP #2 – Rad Racing Gran Prix Tacoma, Washington
 4th USGP #4 – Gran Prix of Gloucester #2 Gloucester, Massachusetts
 5th USGP #5 – Surf City Cyclocross Watsonville, California
 5th USGP #1 – Stumptown Classic Portland, Oregon
 New England Championship Cyclo-cross Series (NECCS)
 1st Chainbiter 7.0 Farmington, Connecticut
 1st Baystate Cross Sterling, Massachusetts
 2nd Caster's Gran Prix Warwick, Rhode Island
 2nd Downeast Cyclocross New Gloucester, Maine
 3rd W.E. Steadman GP South Kingstown, Rhode Island
 3rd Cycle-Smart International Northampton, Massachusetts
 1st Aurora Cross UCI, Canada
2006 – Cannondale/Cyclocrossworld.com
 #1 Ranked Rider National Racing Calendar Standings, USA Cycling
 3rd California Giant Cyclocross National Championships Providence, Rhode Island
 1st California Giant Strawberry Cup Providence, Rhode Island
 2nd Overall, Crank Brothers USGP of Cyclocross Series
 1st USGP #6 – Portland, Oregon
 2nd USGP #5 – Tacoma, Washington
 2nd USGP #4 – Boulder, Colorado
 4th USGP #3 – Longmont, Colorado
 2nd USGP #2 – Gloucester, Massachusetts
 2nd USGP #1 – Gloucester, Massachusetts
 New England Championship Cyclo-cross Series (NECCS)
 1st NECCS Round #7 – Caster's Cross, Warwick, Rhode Island
 1st NECCS Round #6 – W.E. Stedman Grand Prix, South Kingston, Rhode Island
 1st NECCS Round #5 – Bay State Cyclocross, Sterling, Massachusetts
 1st NECCS Round #2 – Downeast Cyclocross #2, New Gloucester, Maine
 1st NECCS Round #1 – Downeast Cyclocross #1, New Gloucester, Maine
 2nd Wissahickon Cross
 4th Granogue Cross
 1st Whitmore's Super Cross Cup #2 Southampton, New York
 2nd Whitmore's Super Cross Cup #1 Southampton, New York
 1st Vermont Grand Prix Burlington, Vermont
2006 – Health Net Pro Cycling Team Presented by Maxxis
 Named Best American Road Team by VeloNews
2007 – Health Net–Maxxis
 8th Overall, Tour de Georgia
2007 – Cannondale/Leer/Cyclocrossworld
  Cyclocross National Champion – Kansas City, Kansas
 2nd Overall, Crank Brothers US Gran Prix of Cyclocross
 1st USGP #5 – Portland Cup #1 Portland, OR
 1st USGP #2 – Derby City Cup #2 Louisville, Kentucky
 2nd USGP #6 – Portland Cup #2 Portland, OR
 2nd USGP #4 – Mercer Cup #2 West Windsor, New Jersey
 2nd USGP #1 – Derby City Cup #1 Louisville, Kentucky
 3rd USGP #3 – Mercer Cup #1 West Windsor, New Jersey
 New England Cyclocross Championship Series (NECCS)
 2nd NECCS #2 – Gran Prix of Gloucester #2 Gloucester, Massachusetts
 3rd NECCS #7 – NBX Gran Prix Warwick, Rhode Island
 3rd NECCS #5 – Baystate Cyclocross Sterling, Massachusetts
 1st Granogue Cross Wilmington, Delaware
 2nd Boulder Cup Boulder, Colorado
 2nd Wissahickon Cross Ludwig's Corners, Pennsylvania
 4th Whitmore's Super Cross Cup #2 Southampton, New York
 4th Whitmore's Super Cross Cup #1 Southampton, New York
2008 – Cannondale/Cyclocrossworld.com
 1st Overall, US Grand Prix of Cyclocross
 1st UGSP #5 – Portland Cup #1 Portland, Oregon
 1st USGP #3 – Mercer Cup #1 West Windsor, New Jersey
 1st USGP #2 – Derby City Cup #2 Louisville, Kentucky
 3rd USGP #6 – Portland Cup #2 Portland, Oregon
 6th USGP #1 – Derby City Cup #1 Louisville, Kentucky
 2nd Overall, North American Cyclocross Trophy
 1st NACT #6 – Boulder Cup #2 Boulder, Colorado
 1st NACT #2 – Rad Racing Lakewood, Washington
 2nd NACT #4 – Gran Prix of Gloucester #2 Gloucester, Massachusetts
 2nd NACT #3 – Gran Prix of Gloucester #1 Gloucester, Massachusetts
 3rd NACT #5 – Boulder Cup #1 Boulder, Colorado
 3rd NACT #1 – Star-Crossed Redmond, Washington
 1st Toronto International Cyclocross #2 Toronto
 2nd Cross Vegas Las Vegas, Nevada
 2nd Toronto International Cyclocross #1 Toronto
 2nd Wissahickon Cross Ludwig's Corners, Pennsylvania
 3rd Granogue Cross Wilmington, Delaware
2009 – Cannondale/Cyclocrossworld.com
  Cyclocross National Champion – Bend, Oregon
 2nd Overall, US Gran Prix of Cyclocross
 1st USGP #6 – Mercer Cup #3 West Windsor, New Jersey
 1st USGP #4 – Derby City Cup #2 Louisville, Kentucky
 2nd USGP #5 – Mercer Cup #1 West Windsor, New Jersey
 3rd USGP #8 – Portland Cup #2 Portland, Oregon
 3rd USGP #3 – Derby City Cup #1 Louisville, Kentucky
 4th USGP #7 – Portland Cup #1 Portland, Oregon
 1st Overall, North American Cyclocross Trophy
 1st NACT #10 – Whitmore's Super Cross Cup #2 – Southampton, New York
 1st NACT #9 – Whitmore's Super Cross Cup #1 – Southampton, New York
 1st NACT #8 – Boulder Cup Boulder, Colorado
 1st NACT #7 – Blue Sky Velo Cup Longmont, Colorado
 1st NACT #5 – Toronto International Cyclocross #1 Toronto
 1st NACT #4 – Gran Prix of Gloucester #2 Gloucester, Massachusetts
 2nd NACT #6 – Toronto International Cyclocross #2 Toronto
 4th NACT #3 – Gran Prix of Gloucester #1 Gloucester, Massachusetts
 New England Cyclocross Championship Series (NECCS)
 1st NECCS #6 – Providence Cyclocross #2 Providence, Rhode Island
 1st NECCS #5 – Providence Cyclocross #1 Providence, Rhode Island

References

External links 
 Official Site
 Cannondale/Cyclocrossworld.com Team
 Team Ouch presented by Maxxis Official Site
 Health Net Pro Cycling Team Biography, including complete results
 Cyclingnews.com An interview with Tim Johnson

American male cyclists
Cyclo-cross cyclists
1977 births
Living people
People from Middleton, Massachusetts
Sportspeople from Essex County, Massachusetts
American cyclo-cross champions
Cyclists from Massachusetts